Aiki is a 2002 Japanese film about a martial artist in a wheelchair, directed and written by Daisuke Tengan. It is loosely based on the life of a Danish practitioner of the Roppokai branch of Daitō-ryū Aiki-jūjutsu, Ole Kingston Jensen, who started training in Daitō-ryū after he was handicapped in an accident and now is the highest ranking non-Japanese member of the Roppokai.

The film premiered at the 2002 Venice Film Festival.

See also
 Aiki (martial arts principle)

References

External links

Interview with Ole Kingston Jensen at aikidojournal.com

2002 martial arts films
2002 films
Japanese martial arts films
Jujutsu
2000s Japanese films